Raef Haggag (born August 8, 1982) is an Egyptian-American singer.

Beginnings 
Raef picked up playing guitar during his time at the University of Maryland, College Park where he studied computer science.

After graduation, Raef worked briefly as a software engineer before leaving to teach high school for eight years. As he says:

"I decided to switch careers from a software eng. to a high school teacher because I wanted to help others in a more direct way (and because it was pretty boring sitting in front of a computer for 8 hours a day)". Raef taught computer programming in Montgomery County Public Schools.

Music career 
Teaching gave Raef more time to focus on songwriting, often performing at local coffee shops and busking at metro stations. He was introduced to the national stage after his trio rock band "Great Seneca" toured the United States of America as part of the "Voices for Change" initiative. Raef also joined the "Poetic Vision Tour"; a band of traveling musicians and poets catering to the American Muslim community. Raef did several Muslim-themed covers of popular mainstream songs, attracting young listeners wanting a modern take on religious music

Raef signed with Awakening Records and released his debut album The Path in 2014. In the summer of 2019 he released his second album Mercy with a notable shift towards rock and country music.

Success in Indonesia 

Since the release of his debut album The Path, Raef has made several trips to Indonesia to promote his music and perform at live concerts. Appearing on Indonesian national television and invited by Bandung mayor Ridwan Kamil to perform at the Bandung Conference brought Raef and his music to millions of Indonesians. Raef was also the star host on 30 episodes of The Journey of a Backpacker, a Ramadan TV series that aired on Kompas TV (later Trans7) across Indonesia and TV Alhijrah in Malaysia. In August 2015, Raef was awarded the "Platinum Award" for record sales in Indonesia. Following the blueprint of Season 1 of "The Journey of a Backpacker", Raef hosted Season 2, airing on Trans7, in which he traveled across Java, visiting 30 historic and iconic mosques.

"We Are Home" music video project 

Using Detroit-based crowdfunding platform LaunchGood, over $22,000 via online donations were raised to fund the music video for "Home," directed by Los-Angeles based director, Lena Khan. The video shows Raef walking through American history observing contributions made by various immigrants to the United States. The video also features contributions made by Native Americans.

"Dear America" music video project 
In his second crowdfunded music video project, Raef raised over $15,000 to fund the music video for "Dear America," directed by Washington DC based film director, Anas Tolba. The video shows clips of Americans across the spectrum experiencing a shared pain, highlighting "the reality of persistent injustices and divisions that are ripping our country apart". "Dear America" won several awards, including New York Movie Award's "Best Music Video"

Philanthropy 

 On 14 April 2012, Raef took part in "Send a Little Hope" charity concert organized by Awakening Records and Save an Orphan organization at London's Hammersmith Apollo with Hamza Namira, Irfan Makki, Maher Zain and Mesut Kurtis to raise awareness and collect donations. Over £175,000 were pledged on the night.

Discography

Albums

Videography

References

External links 
 
 Raef page on Awakening Records website
 
 
 

1982 births
Living people
American Muslims
American people of Egyptian descent
American singer-songwriters
Performers of Islamic music
Awakening Music artists
21st-century American singers
21st-century American male singers
Rotana Records artists
Universal Music Group artists
American male singer-songwriters